WWSH may refer to:

 WWSH-LP, a low-power radio station (97.7 FM) licensed to serve Vero Beach, Florida, United States
 WLEJ-FM, a radio station (98.7 FM) licensed to serve Pleasant Gap, Pennsylvania, United States, which held the call sign WWSH from 2008 to 2011
 WUMR (FM), a radio station (106.1 FM) licensed to serve Philadelphia, Pennsylvania, United States, which held the call sign WWSH from 1970 to 1984